Radhu Karmakar (1919 - 5 October 1993) was a noted Indian cinematographer and director in Hindi cinema from the 1940s to 1990s. He worked extensively with director-actor Raj Kapoor's film and his R. K. Studio. Starting with Awaara (1951), he shot all of his subsequent films for four decades, till his last, Ram Teri Ganga Maili (1985).

He even directed a film, Jis Desh Men Ganga Behti Hai (1960) which was produced by Raj Kapoor, and with Kapoor himself and Padmini as leads. The film won Filmfare Award for Best Film while Karmakar won a nomination for Best Director Award at the 9th Filmfare Awards. At the 8th National Film Awards the film also won Certificate of Merit in the Best Feature Film in Hindi category.

At the 18th National Film Awards, he won the award for National Film Award for Best Cinematography for Mera Naam Joker.  He won the Filmfare Award for Best Cinematographer four times, Shree 420 (1957), Mera Naam Joker (1972), Satyam Shivam Sundaram (1979) and Henna (1992).

Career
Karmakar started his film career in Calcutta with Kismat ki Dhani (1945) followed by Milan (1946) directed by Nitin Bose for Bombay Talkies. Though the film didn't perform at box office, his night sequence photography and high contrast lighting got him acclaim. Soon was chosen to shoot, Raj Kapoor's Awaara (1951). This started a career long association, which lasted four decades. Working on films like Shree 420 (1955), Sangam (1964), Mera Naam Joker (1970), Bobby (1973), Satyam Shivam Sundaram (1978), Prem Rog (1982) and Ram Teri Ganga Maili (1985).  After Raj Kapoor's death in 1988, he continued working with R. K. Studio and shot Henna (1991), a project he started shooting and which was later completed by his son Randhir Kapoor.

Early life
Born in Bikrampur, now in Munshiganj District, near present-day Dhaka, Bangladesh in a Bengali Karmakar family of goldsmiths, the profession which did not interest him much apart from his photography. Karmakar married Baani Rai, the daughter of  businessman Brojendrolal Rai, and moved to Calcutta. Baani Karmakar was the youngest among her seven siblings. Radhu Karmakar and his family resided in Calcutta until in (1951) when he started working with Raj Kapoor in his film Awaara. Raj Kapoor found Karmakar's work commendable when he saw his night sequence photography and high contrast lighting in his last film Milan(1946). Karmakar's family soon moved to Bombay.

Family
Wife - Late Mrs Baani Karmakar
Sons - Krishna Gopal Karmakar and Brojo Gopal Karmakar
Daughters - Sudevi Karmakar, Radha Banerjee, Meera Choudhuri
Grandchildren - Shomita Pandey, Rinky Karmakar, Siddharth Karmakar, Shubhankar Banerjee, Gaurang Karmakar, Anuradha Karmakar, Priyanka Choudhuri, Keshub Karmakar, Rudraraj Karmakar

Death
Karmakar died in a car accident in the Bombay Pune Road while driving back to Bombay. He died on 5 October 1993. At the 42nd National Film Awards of 1995, he was posthumously given a Special Jury Award for Param Vir Chakra and "In appreciation of a lifetime achievement in creating some of the most memorable moments in Indian film history."

His autobiography, Radhu Karmakar: The Painter of Lights, was published posthumously in 2005.

Filmography

Director
 Jis Desh Men Ganga Behti Hai (1960)

Cinematographer
 Kismat Ki Dhani (1945)
 Jwar Bhata (1944)
 Milan (1946)
 Naukadubi (1947)
 Mashal (1950)
 Samar (1950) 
 Awaara (1951) 
 Jagte Raho (1956)
 Shree 420 (1955)
 Sangam (1964)
 Aman (1967) 
 Sapnon Ka Saudagar (1968) 
 Mera Naam Joker (1970)
 Be-Imaan (1972)
 Bobby (1973)
 Sanyasi (1975) 
 Dhoop Chhaon (1977)
 Satyam Shivam Sundaram (1978) 
 Love Story (1981) 
 Prem Rog (1982)
 Ram Teri Ganga Maili (1985)
 Adventures of Tarzan (1985)
 Dance Dance (1987)
 Commando (1988)
 Henna (1991)
 Param Vir Chakra (1995)

Bibliography

References

External links
 
 

1919 births
1993 deaths
Hindi film cinematographers
Bengali people
Filmfare Awards winners
Best Cinematography National Film Award winners
Hindi-language film directors
Film directors from Kolkata
Road incident deaths in India
20th-century Indian film directors
Cinematographers from West Bengal
20th-century Indian photographers
Special Jury Award (feature film) National Film Award winners